Angela Zimmerman (born Andrew, later Andi) is a professor of German history at George Washington University.

Early life and education 
Zimmerman earned a PhD from the University of California, San Diego in 1998, an M.Phil in History and Philosophy of Science, University of Cambridge in 1991, a B.A. (Magna Cum Laude) in History from University of California, Los Angeles in 1990.

Career 
Zimmerman is the author of Anthropology and Antihumanism in Imperial Germany, Alabama in Africa, and several peer-reviewed articles. She edited The Civil War in the United States, a collection of writings on the American Civil War by Karl Marx, Friedrich Engels and others.

Personal life 
Zimmerman uses "She/Her/Hers" pronouns.

Publications
Anthropology and Antihumanism in Imperial Germany (University of Chicago Press, 2001)  
Alabama in Africa: Booker T. Washington, the German Empire, and the Globalization of the New South (University of Princeton Press, 2010) 
“A German Alabama in Africa: The Tuskegee Expedition to German Togo and the Transnational Origins of African Cotton Growers,” American Historical Review 110 (December 2005)
“Looking Beyond History: The Optics of German Anthropology and the Critique of Humanism,” Studies in History and Philosophy of Biological and Biomedical Sciences 32 (2001): 385-411.
“Selin, Pore, and Emil Stephan in the Bismarck Archipelago: A ‘Fresh and Joyful Tale’ of the Origin of Fieldwork,” Journal of the Pacific Arts Association 21/22 (2000): 69-84.1 
“German Anthropology and the ‘Natural Peoples’: The Global Context of Colonial Discourse,” The European Studies Journal, Special Issue: German Colonialism: Another Sonderweg? 16(1999): 95-112.
“Anti-Semitism as Skill: Rudolf Virchow’s Schulstatistik and the Racial Composition of Germany,”Central European History 32 (1999): 409-429.“Geschichtslose und Schriftlose Völker in Spreeathen: Anthropologie als Kritik der Geschichtswissenschaft im Kaiserreich,” Zeitschrift für Geschichtswissenschaften 47 (1999): 197-210.
“Legislating Being: Words and Things in Bentham’s Panopticon,” The European Legacy 3 (1998): 72-83.
“The Ideology of the Machine and The Spirit of the Factory: Remarx on Babbage and Ure,” Cultural Critique 37 (Fall 1997): 5-29

References 

Historians of Germany
21st-century American historians
University of California, San Diego alumni
George Washington University faculty
Alumni of the University of Cambridge
University of California, Los Angeles alumni
Professors of German in the United States
Living people
Columbian College of Arts and Sciences faculty
Year of birth missing (living people)